Max Azria (January 1, 1949 – May 6, 2019) was a Tunisian-Jewish-born American fashion designer who founded the contemporary women's clothing brand BCBG MAX AZRIA. Azria was also the designer, chairman and CEO of the BCBG Max Azria Group, a global fashion house that encompassed over 20 brands. Azria left BCBG in 2016. BCBG Max Azria filed for bankruptcy in 2017 and was sold to Marquee Brands and Global Brands Group.

Later Azria served as the CEO of ZappLight.

Early life and education 
Max Azria was born in Sfax, Tunisia as the youngest of six children to a Sephardic Jewish (Tunisian-Jewish) family. As a child, Azria was educated in southeastern France before his family relocated to Paris, France in 1963. His brother is Serge Azria, the founder of the women's clothing lines Joie, Current/Elliott and Equipment.

Career 
After 11 years of designing a line of women's apparel in Paris, Azria moved to Los Angeles, California in 1981 and launched Jess, a series of new-concept retail boutiques for women's apparel.

In 1989, Azria launched BCBG Max Azria, named for the French phrase "bon chic, bon genre," a Parisian slang meaning "good style, good attitude". Azria was credited for offering designer fashion at affordable price points and, as a result, was inducted into the Council of Fashion Designers of America (CFDA) in 1998. The BCBG Max Azria Runway collection was first presented at New York Fashion Week in 1996.

Azria also maintained two eponymous designer collections, Max Azria Atelier and Max Azria. Launched in February 2004, Max Azria Atelier is a collection of couture gowns created for celebrity clients and red-carpet events. Sharon Stone, Halle Berry, Fergie and Alicia Keys have worn the label on the red carpet. In February 2006, Azria debuted Max Azria, a ready-to-wear collection with a directional aesthetic, on the runway at New York Fashion Week. During the 2009 awards season, Angelina Jolie wore Max Azria to the 2009 Screen Actors Guild Awards and the 2009 Critics Choice Awards. The company bought out the bankrupt G+G Retail, which operated the G+G and Rave brands, in 2006.

Azria acquired the Hervé Léger fashion house in 1998, marking the first time in history that an American designer had acquired a French couturier. In early 2007, Azria relaunched the Hervé Léger label with his own designs, which were quickly embraced by celebrities and trendsetters worldwide.

In Fall 2008, Max Azria presented BCBG Max Azria Runway, Max Azria and Hervé Léger by Max Azria at New York Fashion Week, marking the first time an American designer produced three major fashion shows during one New York Fashion Week.

Azria launched a young contemporary collection called BCBGeneration in 2008. In June 2009, Azria teamed up with Miley Cyrus to create a line for Walmart called Miley Cyrus & Max Azria. Azria also designed clothing for Cyrus' 2009 American tour.

Azria left BCBG in 2016 as the company foundered. BCBG Max Azria filed for bankruptcy in 2017 and was sold to Marquee Brands and Global Brands Group.

On May 31, 2017, ZappLight announced that Max Azria joined ZappLight and its parent co Clean Concept LLC as CEO and partner. "Though fashion and technology are inherently different, they increasingly intersect as both are centered on pushing the boundaries of great design and in inspiring and delighting consumers. I am thrilled to be part of this new and exciting venture to grow ZappLight into a global brand, adopted in homes everywhere to prevent virus-carrying insects," Max Azria said in a statement.

Entrepreneurial at heart, it was only natural for the 68 year old to dive into a startup rather than retire. ZappLight is a "2-in-1" LED light bulb and bug zapper. ZappLight is disrupting the bug zapper industry that has been around since the 80's. The ZappLight's new spin is combining an LED light that attracts bugs and mosquitoes and functions as an actual light bulb, along with the zapping technology of old. The ZappLight is a bulb and not an entire fixture, meaning that homeowners can install them in any of their open bulb light fixtures outside.

BCBG Max Azria Group is a global fashion house with a portfolio including more than 20 brands. Max Azria was the CEO, chairman and head designer and his widow, Lubov Azria is the chief creative officer.

As of 2006, there were over 550 BCBG Max Azria boutiques worldwide, including locations in London, Paris, Tokyo, Santiago and Hong Kong. Azria's collections are also sold in specialty stores and major department stores across the globe, including Nordstrom, Saks Fifth Avenue, Bergdorf Goodman, Lord & Taylor, Bloomingdale's, Macy's, Dillard's, the UK's Harvey Nichols, Hong Kong's Lane Crawford, Taiwan's Mitsukoshi and Singapore's Takashimaya stores.

BCBG Max Azria Group campaigns regularly feature notable models, including Eva Herzigova, Karen Elson and Jessica Stam. The company frequently works with internationally renowned photographers such as Patrick Demarchelier, Paolo Roversi and David Sims. BCBG Max Azria Group clothing is frequently featured in major fashion publications such as Vogue, InStyle and Vanity Fair, and in online sites such as Style.com and iFashion Network.

Recent history
BCBG Max Azria Group filed for Chapter 11 bankruptcy protection on February 28, 2017;  it was reported that in July 2017 the brand and its sister labels would be taken over by Marquee Brands and Global Brands Group, which bought the intellectual property rights and assets of the company.

Personal life 
Azria was married twice. He was divorced from his first wife with whom he had three children: Michael John Azria (born 1974), Joyce Azria Nassir (born 1981), and Marine Azria (born 1984). Azria remarried to Ukrainian-born Lubov Azria, chief creative officer for BCBG Max Azria Group. They had three children together: Chloe (born 1993), Anais (born 1996), and Agnes (born 1997). His daughter, Joyce Azria, was named creative director of BCBGeneration in 2009. He and his family resided in a house designed by Paul Williams in Holmby Hills, Los Angeles, California. It was formerly owned by the late Sidney Sheldon.

Death
Azria died of lung cancer at a hospital in Houston on May 6, 2019, aged 70.

See also
 Retail apocalypse
 List of retailers affected by the retail apocalypse

References

External links
 Official BCBG Max Azria website
 

1949 births
2019 deaths
American Sephardic Jews
American people of Tunisian-Jewish descent
American fashion designers
American fashion businesspeople
Businesspeople from Los Angeles
California people in fashion
Deaths from lung cancer in Texas
Jewish American artists
Jewish fashion designers
People from Sfax
Tunisian people of French descent
Tunisian emigrants to the United States
Tunisian emigrants to France
Tunisian Jews
Tunisian fashion designers
People from Holmby Hills, Los Angeles
20th-century American businesspeople
American Mizrahi Jews
21st-century American Jews